Commodore John Downes (December 23, 1784August 11, 1854) was an officer in the United States Navy, whose service covered the first half of the 19th century.

Early life and career
John Downes was born in Canton, Massachusetts on December 23, 1784. He served as acting midshipman from September 9, 1800, and was appointed midshipman June 1, 1802. He rendered distinguished service during the First Barbary War in 1804 in the frigate , and distinguished himself again while a midshipman on the frigate New York in a boat attack upon Tripolitan feluccas.

In March 1807, he was made a lieutenant, and served as executive officer for Captain David Porter in  during her cruise in the Pacific in the War of 1812. In the action off James Island, Downes was in command of the sloop Georgiana during the capture of three British whalers. He also participated in the action off Charles Island before sailing to Nuku Hiva to assist in building America's first military base in the Pacific.

Among the Essex many prizes was the whale ship Atlantic,  "which Captain Porter fitted as a cruiser and classified as a sloop-of-war, with twenty guns, named the Essex Junior, and placed under the command of Lieutenant Downes who retained this place until the capture of the Essex, and the conversion of Essex Junior into a cartel, 28 March 1814."

Downes was promoted to master commandant in 1813, and two years later commanded the brig , in the squadron employed against Algiers under Stephen Decatur. On June 17, 1815 he, in concert with the rest of Decatur's squadron, captured the Algerian frigate Mashouda. Two days later the Epervier and three of the smaller vessels of the squadron captured the Algerine brig of war Estedio with twenty-two guns and 180 men off Cape Paios. After the conclusion of peace with Algiers, Decatur transferred Downes to his own ship, .

He became captain in March 1817.

On this trip, he decided to use the ship for his own enrichment and became a banking ship, giving protection, passage and banking service to privateers, pirates and others. He took large amounts for his own private use. He took at least 2.6 million in specie during his trip. He so angered his associates, whom he kept busy counting money under poor conditions, that one of his midshipmen, William Rodgers, resigned from the Navy after coming ashore from this three-year voyage. He cited not being able to "do what I joined this man's Navy to do. Not being able to serve my country but to simply be serving for the monetary good of Captain Downes". Captain Downes had so much specie aboard that he was able to bribe Lord Cochrane into allowing the Macedonian to pass Cochrane's blockade.

Squadron Commodore

His next assignment (1832–1834) was to command the Pacific Squadron. In 1832, Downes was ordered to the coast of Sumatra to avenge an attack on the American merchantman Friendship, of Salem, Massachusetts.

In February 1831, the American merchant ship arrived at the harbor of Quallah Battoo on the Pedir coast of Sumatra to take on a cargo of pepper. A Malay boat arrived, but as the pepper was loaded the Malays, on signal, attacked the officers and crew. According to Owen Rutter's Pirate Wind, every American on board was killed before the pirates ransacked the ship and took its cargo.

The captain however, had been on shore with four of his crew. He returned to the ship, fled and received help from other American ships also trading on the coast. They returned to Salem, the headquarters of much of America's trade with the East at that time, and also reported that the local chieftain denied any knowledge of the attack in his harbor.

President Andrew Jackson, along with many Americans, was outraged and vowed retribution. If there was a regular government that Downes could deal with, he was authorized to negotiate with it, if not, he was to "inflict chastisement" on any "band of lawless pirates" responsible for the atrocity. Downes, in command of the Potomac left New York harbor August 28, 1831 bound for Quallah Battoo by way of the Cape of Good Hope and the Indian Ocean.

First Sumatran Expedition

The ship arrived at Quallah Battoo on February 5, 1832. Although Downes was told to attempt to negotiate first, he relied on the advice of a native who seemed to be friendly and who advised that the local chieftain was unlikely to negotiate "except with a very sharp knife on his gullet."

Early on February 7, Downes sent a detachment of marines and three detachments of seamen (a total of 282 men) with orders to take four Malay forts along the coast. They divided into three parties, attacked the forts in a combination of hand-to-hand combat and bombardment from the ship's 30-pound cannons. In five hours, the forts were taken, reportedly with all 150 of the defenders, including the local chieftain, fighting to the death.

On February 9, the ship bombarded the village itself, which caught on fire. The action resulted in another 300 dead.

Return voyage
The Potomac then proceeded around the world, becoming the second U.S. naval vessel (after the Vincennes under Commander William B. Finch) to circumnavigate the globe. The ship was also the first to host sitting royalty – the king and queen of the Hawaiian Islands.

When Downes arrived at Valparaíso, Chile, Jeremiah N. Reynolds, an American explorer and author, joined the expedition as the commodore's private secretary for the trip and wrote a book about the experience, Voyage of the United States Frigate Potomac.

Downes' sea service terminated with this cruise.

On returning home, Downes was severely criticized for his harsh actions, but Jackson supported him, saying the fighting would deter future aggression. Yet the action wasn't absolutely successful – in August 1838 another American merchant ship, the Eclipse, was attacked by 24 Malays who had been allowed on board. The United States responded with the Second Sumatran Expedition, which had a more lasting effect.

Later life
From 1837 to 1842, and from 1850 to 1852, he commanded the Charlestown Navy Yard in Boston Harbor. He died there on August 11, 1854.

Namesakes
Three ships in the United States Navy have been named USS Downes in honor of him.

Genovesa Island in the Galápagos is referred to in English as "Tower" Island, which is presumably a corruption of "Downes". Downes reported the island's position in 1813, while aboard the Essex, and the name "Dowers's" appeared in 1815, presumably a misspelled reference to Downes. After passing through "Dowers's", "Dowers", and "Tower's", by 1841 it was written as "Tower" in the British Admiralty chart.

Footnotes

External links

1786 births
1854 deaths
American military personnel of the First Barbary War
People from Boston
People from Canton, Massachusetts
United States Navy officers
United States Navy personnel of the War of 1812
Burials at Mount Auburn Cemetery
Military personnel from Massachusetts